William Dugald MacDougall (June 20, 1868 – March 5, 1943) was a rear admiral of the Fifth Naval District in the United States Navy.

Biography
He was born at Auburn, New York, on June 20, 1868, to Clinton Dugald MacDougall and Eva Sabine. He graduated from the United States Naval Academy in 1889. He married Charlotte Sackett Stone. One of their daughters married Henrik Kauffmann, Denmark's ambassador to the United States during World War II.

He retired on July 1, 1932.  He died on March 5, 1943, in Portsmouth, New Hampshire.  He was buried at Arlington National Cemetery.

References

1868 births
1943 deaths
Burials at Arlington National Cemetery
United States Navy admirals
People from Auburn, New York